Four Seasons is a jazz album recorded by the Toshiko Akiyoshi Trio in 1990 and released on the Nippon Crown record label.  It is not to be confused with the 1996 Toshiko Akiyoshi Jazz Orchestra (BMG) recording, Four Seasons of Morita Village.

Track listing
 "Spring Is Here" (Rodgers, Hart) – 6:56 
 "Suddenly it is Spring" (Van Heusen) – 6:21 
 "Summertime" (Gershwin, Heyward) – 5:00 
 "Indian Summer" (Herbert, Dubin) – 6:15 
 "Autumn Sea" (Akiyoshi) – 6:43
 "Autumn Leaves" (Kosma, Prévert, Mercer) – 5:17 
 "Winter Wonderland" (Bernard, Smith) – 3:39 
 "Santa Claus Is Coming to Town" (Coots, Gillespie) – 5:11
 "Springtime for Hitler" (Brooks) – 4:07

Personnel
 Toshiko Akiyoshi – piano 
 George Mraz – bass   
 Lewis Nash – drums

References
Nippon Crown CRCJ-91002 
Four Seasons at [ Allmusic.com]

Toshiko Akiyoshi albums
1990 albums
Albums recorded at Van Gelder Studio